Claudio Pafundi (born 31 January 1962) is an Argentine archer. He competed in the men's individual event at the 1988 Summer Olympics.

References

1962 births
Living people
Argentine male archers
Olympic archers of Argentina
Archers at the 1988 Summer Olympics
Place of birth missing (living people)
20th-century Argentine people